William Beckett (born February 11, 1985) is an American musician who is the lead vocalist and primary lyricist of the Chicago-based rock band The Academy Is..., who signed to Atlantic Records/Fueled by Ramen/Decaydance Records. While still in high school in 2002, Beckett and guitarist Mike Carden came together from rival bands in Chicago to form The Academy Is... In addition to founding the band, Beckett and Carden are credited as the primary songwriters. A third core member of the band was Adam T. Siska, Beckett's classmate and friend from Barrington High School.

In 2007, Alex Davies from the BBC described Beckett as a mix of Adam Lazzara and Prince, labeling him "utterly captivating".

The Academy Is...  reunited at Riot Fest 2015 in the fall of 2015 in Chicago. Although Beckett had said the occasion would serve as a "farewell" show, the band later had an additional final tour later in the year.

Music
Beckett started writing music for his own private pleasure because he did not like the material that was on the radio anymore. He said in an interview that his sister found him playing his songs in the basement and started joining him. She was his first audience and gave him her honest feedback on the material he wrote.

Prior to co-founding The Academy Is... with Mike Carden, Beckett performed in an acoustic band called Remember Maine, with Nick Scimeca, releasing the album The Last Place You Look on LLR Recordings when he was 17 years old.

Beckett has also sung on a number of notable albums by other bands, such as the track "Sophomore Slump or Comeback of the Year" from Fall Out Boy's 2005 album, From Under the Cork Tree. He sang backing vocals on Fall Out Boy's "What a Catch, Donnie". Other songs he has sung on include "There's a Class for This" from Cute Is What We Aim For's 2006 album The Same Old Blood Rush with a New Touch, "7 Weeks" from Gym Class Heroes's album As Cruel as School Children, and the Cobra Starship song "Snakes on a Plane (Bring It)," which later appeared on the Snakes on a Plane soundtrack and on Cobra Starship's album While the City Sleeps, We Rule the Streets under the title "Bring It (Snakes on a Plane)".

Beckett also has a songwriting credit on Hey Monday's song "Homecoming" from their debut album Hold On Tight and on Demi Lovato's song "For the Love of a Daughter" from her third album Unbroken.

After breaking up The Academy Is..., allegedly to start a solo music career (though other reasons such as internal strife within the band were hunted at), he released first EP, Walk the Talk on April 17, 2012, with the single "Compromising Me". His second EP was announced on June 18, 2012, entitled Winds Will Change (produced by Matt Grabe), and was released July 17, 2012, and the main single "Great Night", being released on June 19, 2012. His third EP, What Will Be, was released October 30, 2012. In January 2013, William released a compilation of acoustic covers of his own music, titled The Pioneer Sessions. In February 2013, William was signed to Equal Vision Records. Later in 2013, it was announced that William's debut full-length album, titled Genuine and Counterfeit, would be released in August. The first single off the album, "Benny & Joon", was released June 17, 2013. The music video for the same was released July 31.

William played the Acoustic Basement tent of the 2013 Van's Warped Tour, where he played not only "Benny & Joon", but much of his solo discography and a few The Academy Is... songs.

The eagerly anticipated Genuine and Counterfeit was released August 20, 2013, though he leaked it to Alternative Press five days prior. It was met with a generally good reception from William's fans.

On September 5, 2013, the Punk Goes... album series by Fearless Records released their Punk Goes Christmas album, which featured William Beckett's cover of "Do You Hear What I Hear?"

William Beckett is on Downwrite, a website that allows artists to connect with their fans, and for fans to buy personalized music from the artist.

Side projects
William Beckett makes a cameo in Fall Out Boy's music video for the song "A Little Less Sixteen Candles, a Little More "Touch Me"" as the lead vampire and in "This Ain't a Scene, It's an Arms Race" video as the same vampire. He also appears in the music video for "Bring It (Snakes on a Plane)" by Cobra Starship, following his vocal appearance in the song.

According to Us Magazine, he is co-authoring a book with Fall Out Boy's Pete Wentz, who had originally recommended the band to label Fueled by Ramen.

On April 16, 2009, Beckett posted the first chapter of the book he hopes to have published, entitled The Folding.

Beckett announced via his blog on July 12, 2010 (the post has now been deleted and replaced with an update post) that he would be starring in a short film based on Edgar Allan Poe's The Fall of the House of Usher.

Beckett wrote the theme song for John Scalzi's novel, Lock In, released on August 28, 2014.

Personal life
In a November 2009 interview with Alternative Press, Beckett confirmed that he has a child.

He has been married to Christine Bandy since May 2007.

Beckett performed a DJ set at Emo Nite Day, a festival hosted by Emo Nite, in Los Angeles in December 2017.

Solo discography
Walk the Talk EP (April 17, 2012)
Winds Will Change EP (July 17, 2012)
What Will Be EP (October 30, 2012)
The Pioneer Sessions (January 22, 2013)
Genuine & Counterfeit (August 20, 2013)

Guest appearances

References

External links
 The Academy Is... Website
 Beckett web interview, Spin Magazine

1985 births
Living people
American male singer-songwriters
American rock singers
American rock guitarists
American male guitarists
American rock songwriters
Singers from Chicago
People from Libertyville, Illinois
Guitarists from Chicago
Decaydance Records artists
Fueled by Ramen artists
Equal Vision Records artists
21st-century American guitarists
21st-century American male singers
21st-century American singers
Singer-songwriters from Illinois